Yuri Alexeyevich Trutnev (2 November 1927 – 6 August 2021) was a Russian physicist and a professor of engineering at the National Research Nuclear University MEPhI (Moscow Engineering Physics Institute). 

His career in physics spent in the former Soviet program of development of nuclear weapons and was one the designers in the RDS-37 (the Soviet Union's first two-stage thermonuclear device), and the RDS-220 (the largest-ever-yield nuclear device) and many other nuclear charges.

Career
He graduated from the Physics department of the Leningrad State University. In 1951, he was sent to Arzamas-16, also known as KB-11 (English: Design Bureau-11), now the All-Russian Scientific Research Institute of Experimental Physics (VNIIEF), in the closed city of Sarov, Nizhny Novgorod Oblast. He was one of the main authors of the final report concerning the configuration and feasibility calculations of the RDS-37, which was detonated successfully a few months later in November 1955. For this work, he was awarded the Order of Lenin, the first of several national awards. He then worked on 'Project 49', with Yuri Babayev, which involved technical improvements in the implosion of the two-stage charges, which were tested successfully in 1958 and put into production. The second and third stages of the RDS-220 were designed principally by Trutnev and Babayev. In 1964, he was appointed head of his department and deputy head of the sector. He was elected a corresponding member of the Russian Academy of Sciences (RAS) the same year. The following year he became head of the sector and in 1966 deputy supervisor. In 1978, he became first deputy supervisor and head of the theoretical department. He became an Academician of the RAS in 1991. From 1993 to 1999, he was first deputy supervisor of VNIIEF.

Trutnev began development of nuclear devices for industrial civilian purposes such as reservoir creation and gas field intensification, and devices which released very low amounts of ionising radiation. Yevgeny Avrorin described Trutnev producing the first "clean" nuclear charge, "a purely thermonuclear reaction" from a solid compound.

Employees at Arzamas-16, including Trutnev, were upset that on a visit by Edward Teller and Siegfried S. Hecker (then director of the Los Alamos National Laboratory) to Russia after the break-up of the USSR, each was photographed in front of a model of the RDS-220 alongside scientists in Snezhinsk. Trutnev insisted that a new photograph be taken of Hecker at VNIIEF in front of a similar model, as it was he and his colleagues at VNIIEF in Sarov who designed the device.

Trutnev was the editor-in-chief of the Atomic Science and Technology journal and deputy editor-in-chief of the International Scientific Journal for Alternative Energy and Ecology. He was one of the RAS members who were critical of proposed administrative changes to the RAS by the Russian state in 2013, changes which included the transfer of academic institutions and property (RAS election candidates must now be government-approved and the winner approved by the president).

Awards
 1956, 1962: Order of Lenin.
 1959: Lenin Prize.
 1962: Hero of Socialist Labour.
 1972: Order of the October Revolution.
 1975, 1987: Order of the Red Banner of Labour.
 1984: State Prize of the USSR.
 1998, 2003, 2012, 2017: Order "For Merit to the Fatherland" (3rd class, 2nd class, 4th class, 1st class).
 2002: Kurchatov Medal.

References 

1927 births
2021 deaths
Scientists from Moscow
Soviet physicists
Soviet engineers
Russian inventors
20th-century Russian physicists
Theoretical physicists
Corresponding Members of the USSR Academy of Sciences
Full Members of the Russian Academy of Sciences
Lenin Prize winners
Heroes of Socialist Labour
Recipients of the Order of Lenin
Recipients of the Order of the Red Banner of Labour
Recipients of the USSR State Prize
Full Cavaliers of the Order "For Merit to the Fatherland"